The 33rd Junior World Luge Championships took place under the auspices of the International Luge Federation at Altenberg, Germany from 2 to 3 February 2018.

Schedule
Four events will be held.

Medalists

Medal table

References

Junior World Luge Championships
Junior World Luge Championships
Junior World Luge Championships
Luge
Sport in Altenberg, Saxony
International luge competitions hosted by Germany
Junior World Luge Championships
2010s in Saxony